Ardachu is a village within the area of Rogart, Sutherland in the Scottish Highlands, within the Highland Council area. It lies on the River Fleet, west of Rogart.

References

Populated places in Sutherland